Alexia Kyriazi (born 15 December 1995) is a Greek group rhythmic gymnast. 

She represents her nation at international competitions. She participated at the 2012 Summer Olympics in London. She also competed at world championships, including at the 2011  World Rhythmic Gymnastics Championships.

References

External links

http://www.bbc.com/sport/olympics/2012/athletes/3983ff4d-5178-4f19-9b03-aeed5a05b7cc
https://in.pinterest.com/pin/511088257688541583/
https://web.archive.org/web/20130312093710/http://jo-2012.net/athlete/detail/5269/Alexia-Kyriazi

1995 births
Living people
Greek rhythmic gymnasts
Place of birth missing (living people)
Gymnasts at the 2012 Summer Olympics
Olympic gymnasts of Greece